This is a list of aircraft in alphabetical order beginning with 'V'.

V

V-STOL
(V-STOL Aircraft Fort Myers, Florida, United States)
 V-STOL Pairadigm
 V-STOL Solution
 V-STOL Super Solution 2000
 V-STOL XC 2000T

V-TOL Aerospace 
 V-TOL Aerospace Hammerhead
 V-TOL Aerospace i-copter Phantom
 V-TOL Aerospace i-copter Seeker

Vagel-Grip
(Vagel-Grip Flugzeugbau, Johannistal)
 Vagel-Grip SP-5 Greif Sarotti

Vajic
(Borislav Vajic)
 Vajic V-55

Vakhmistrov 
(Vladimir Vakhmistrov, Soviet Union)
 Vakhmistrov I-Ze
 Vakhmistrov Zveno-1
 Vakhmistrov Zveno-1a
 Vakhmistrov Zveno-2
 Vakhmistrov Zveno-3
 Vakhmistrov Zveno-5
 Vakhmistrov Zveno-6
 Vakhmistrov Zveno-7
 Vakhmistrov Aviamatka (Airborne mothership)

Valentin
(Valentin Flugzeugbau GmbH, Hasfurt, Germany)
 Valentin Taifun

Valladeau
 Valladeau light aircraft

Valley Engineering
(Valley Engr (Gene & Larry Smith), Rolla, Missouri, United States)
 Valley Engineering Back Yard Flyer UL

Valmet 
(Valmet OY Lentokonetehdas - Valmet Aircraft Factory, Finland)
 Valmet L-70 Vinka
 Valmet L-80 Turbo-Vinha
 Valmet L-90 Redigo
 Valmet L-90TP Redigo
 Valmet PIK-23 Towmaster
 Valmet Tuuli I
 Valmet Tuuli II
 Valmet Tuuli III
 Valmet Tuuli IV
 Valmet Vihuri I
 Valmet Vihuri II
 Valmet Vihuri III

Valunas 
(Y.Valunas, Prenai, Lithuania)
 Valunas Va-1 (a.k.a. Valuno Va-1)

VAMP
(VAMP (Van Dersarl Motor Products) Aircraft Co, Denver, Colorado, United States)
 VAMP CV

Van Anden
(Frank Van Anden, Islip, New York, United States)
 Van Anden 1911 Biplane

Van Berkel
(Van Berkel's Patent Company Ltd)
 Van Berkel W-A
 Van Berkel W-B
 Van Berkel W-F

Van Camp-Murray
(Vernon Van Camp and Durard Murray, Kingman, Kansas, United States)
 Van Camp-Murray Sport

Van Cleave
(William Van Cleave, Love Field, Dallas, Texas, United States)
 Van Cleave 1928 Biplane

Van Dine
(Peter D Van Dine, Merganser Aircraft Corp, Annapolis, Maryland, United States)
 Van Dine Merganser 1
 Van Dine Merganser 2
 Van Dine Merganser 3

Van Duzer
(Frank Van Duzer, Waukegan, Illinois, United States)
 Van Duzer 1936 Monoplane

Van Lith
(Jean Van Lith)
 Van Lith IV
 Van Lith VI

van Meel
(Marinus van Meel)
 van Meel Brikken original version
 van Meel Brikken II Two-seater
 van Meel Brikken II Waterbrik
 van Meel Brikken III Two-seater

Van Pomer
(John Van Pomer, Fort Edward, New York, United States)
 Van Pomer 1910 Biplane

Van Valkenberg
(Eber H Van Valkenberg Aircraft Co, McKeesport, Pennsylvania and Toledo, Ohio, United States)(Van Valkenberg Aircraft Limited, Edmonton, Alberta, Canada)
 Van Valkenberg 1927 Monoplane
 Van Valkenberg VM-11
 Van Valkenberg M-2(CF-ATT)(1933)
 Van Valkenberg BM-3 Bayamo(1935)

Van's 
(Van's Aircraft Inc, North Plains, Oregon, United States)
 Van's RV-3
 Van's RV-4
 Van's RV-5 Swinger
 Van's RV-6
 Van's RV-7
 Van's RV-8
 Van's RV-9
 Van's RV-10
 Van's RV-11
 Van's RV-12
 Van's RV-14
 Van's RV-15

Vancil
(Belton, South Carolina, United States)
Vancil Spitz S1

VanDellen
(Lubert VanDellen, Pella, Indiana or Oklahoma City, Oklahoma, United States)
 Van Dellen LH-2

Vance
(Vance Aircraft Inc, Fresno and Oakland, California, United States)
 Vance 1923 Biplane
 Viking Cargo Plane
 Vance Viking
 Vance M-1 Golden Arrow
 Vance V-1 Golden Arrow
 Vance V-S-1 Baby Lark
 Vance Flying Wing Express
 Vance Texas Sky Ranger

Vancil
(A. Vancil)
 Vancil Spitz S1

Vanderford
(William Vanderford, Gladbrook, Iowa, United States)
 Vanderford 1923 Monoplane

VanGrunsven 
(Richard VanGrunsven)
 VanGrunsven RV-1

Vanguard
(Vanguard Air and Marine Corp (pres: Edward Vanderlip), Radnor, Pennsylvania, United States)
 Vanguard Model 2C
 Vanguard Model 2D Omniplane

Melvin Vaniman
(Melvin Vaniman)
 Vaniman Triplane 1bis

Vantuil
(Ibbs "Dutch" Vantuil)
 Vantuil Flying Dutchman

Varga 
(László Varga / Repülő Muszaki Intézet (RMI))
Data from:
 Varga X\G
 Varga X\H
 Varga X\N
 Varga V\G
 Varga Z\G

Varga
((George) Varga, Chandler, Arizona, United States)
 Varga 2150 Kachina
 Varga 2150A Kachina
 Varga 2180
 Varga 2180TG

Varney 
(Walter T Varney Aeroplanes, 832 Post St, San Francisco, California, United States)
 Varney 1921 Biplane

Vashon Aircraft
(Woodinville, Washington, United States)
Vashon Ranger R7

VBS

 VBS Kunkadlo

VEB
(VEB Flugzeugwerke, Dresden, East Germany)
 Baade 152
 V.E B 154 I
 V.E B 154 II

Vecihi Hürkuş 
 Vecihi K-VI
 Vecihi K-XIV
 Vecihi K-XV
 Vecihi K-XVI Nuri Bey

VEF 
(Valsts Elektrotehniskā Fabrika - State Electrotechnical Factory)
 VEF I-1 Spriditis (Pulins P-2)
 VEF I-2 Ikars  (Pulins P-3)
 VEF I-3
 VEF I-4 Vanadzins
 VEF I-5 Ikars
 VEF I-6 Gambija
 VEF I-7 Zilais Putns
 VEF I-8 Zilais Putns II – K.Irbitis
 VEF I-8a – K.Irbitis
 VEF I-9 Kaija
 VEF I-11 -  K.Irbitis
 VEF I-12
 VEF I-14
 VEF I-15
 VEF I-16
 VEF I-17
 VEF I-19
 VEF JDA 1936 fighter
 VEF JDA-10M
 VEF-1 modified Grüne Post
 VEF SV-5 (Stampe et Vertongen SV-5) - 6 built

Vega 
(Walter T Varney Aeroplanes / Vega Aircraft Co. Burbank, California, United States)
 Vega 35-67
 Vega 37
 Vega 140
 Vega B-40
 Vega 1 Flying Test Stand
 Vega Model 2 Starliner
 Vega Model 22 Starliner
 Vega Model 24 Starliner

Vejraska 
(Victor Vejraska, Friend, Nebraska, United States)
 Vejraska Arrow

Veleria Dedalo
(Gradara, Italy)
Veleria Dedalo Strike-T

Velie 
(Velie Motor Co.)
 Velie Monocoupe

Velocity 
(Velocity Inc, Sebastian, Florida and Lincoln, California, United States)
 Velocity SE
 Velocity XL
 Velocity 173
 Velocity Delta Hawk
 Velocity Standard
 Velocity V-Twin

Vendôme
(Raoul Vendôme)
 Odier-Vendôme 1909 Biplane
 Vendôme III
 Vendôme La Moustique

Venga
(Venga Aircraft Inc.)
 Venga TG-10 Brushfire

Ventura
(La Frette, Isère, France)
Ventura 1200

Venture 
 Venture T-211

Verdaguer
 Verdaguer FVA (tandem biplane bi-motor)

Verhees Engineering
(Lommel, Belgium)
Verhees D-Plane 1

Verilite 
(Verilite Aircraft Co, div of De Vore Aviation (pres: Gil De Vore), Albuquerque, New Mexico, United States)
 Verilite Model 100 Sunbird

Verner
 Verner W-01 Brouček

Verrue
(Maurice Verrue)
 Verrue Mighty Midjet

Vertak 
(Vertak Corp, Troy, Ohio, United States)
 Vertak S-229 ESTOL

Vertaplane

see Herrick

Vertical
(Vertical Aviation Technologies Inc (pres: Brad Clark), Sanford, Florida, United States/ Vertical Aviation Technology / VAT)
 VAT S-52-3
 Vertical Hummingbird
 Vertical Hummingbird 260L
 Vertical Hummingbird 300LS
 Vertical Elite

Verticraft
 Verticraft Verticar

Vertol 
(Vertol Aircraft Corporation after name change from Piasecki Helicopter Corporation in 1955; United States)
 Vertol H-16
 Vertol H-21 Shawnee
 Vertol H-25 Retriever
 Vertol HC-1A - CH-46 Sea Knight
 Vertol HC-1B - CH-47 Chinook
 Vertol VZ-2
 Vertol HRB Sea Knight
 Vertol HUP
 Vertol CH-125 RCAF
 Vertol CH-127 RCAF
 Vertol CH-113 Labrador Canadian Armed Forces
 Vertol 44 - same aircraft as VZ-2
 Vertol 76
 Vertol 107 - company model number for prototype Sea Knight
 Vertol 114 - HC-1B

Vervillle 
( (Alfred V) Verville Aircraft Co, Green & Melville Aves, Detroit, Michigan, United States)
 Verville 1915 Biplane
 Verville 104-A Air Coach
 Verville 104-C Air Coach
 Verville 104-P Air Coach
 Verville AT Sportsman
 Verville AT-4 Sportsman
 Verville LT Sportsman
 Verville PT-10
 Verville VCP
 Verville-Packard R-1 Racer (a.k.a. Verville-Packard (Sperry) Racer)
 Verville-Sperry R-3 Racer (a.k.a. Verville-Packard (Sperry) Racer)
 Verville-Sperry M-1 Messenger
 Buhl-Verville CA-3 Airster

Vervoost Leichtflugzeuge
(Sinzig, Germany)
Vervoost FV-3 Delphin

VFTHB 
(Versuchsflugzeugbau Technische Hochschule Breslau)
 Schmeidler SN-2

VFW-Fokker 
(Germany/Netherlands)
 VFW-Fokker 614
 VFW-Fokker H2
 VFW-Fokker H3
 VFW-Fokker FK-3
 VFW-Fokker Sirius
 VFW-Fokker SG 1262

VGO
(Versuchsbau G.m.b.H. Gotha-Ost)
 VGO.I (RM L.I - Reichs Marine Landflugzeug 1 (Reich Navy Landplane 1))
 VGO.II
 VGO.III

Viberti 
(Ali Verberti SpA)
 Viberti Musca 1

Vickers/Vickers-Armstrong 
(United Kingdom)
(See Also Supermarine)
 Vickers Type 123
 Vickers Type 141
 Vickers Type 143
 Vickers Type 150
 Vickers Type 161
 Vickers Type 163
 Vickers Type 177
 Vickers Type 255
 Vickers Type 432
 Vickers Boxkite
 Vickers E.F.B.1
 Vickers E.F.B.2
 Vickers E.F.B.3
 Vickers E.S.1
 Vickers F.B.5 "Gunbus"
 Vickers F.B.7
 Vickers F.B.8
 Vickers F.B.9
 Vickers F.B.11
 Vickers F.B.12
 Vickers F.B.14
 Vickers F.B.16
 Vickers F.B.19
 Vickers F.B.24
 Vickers F.B.25
 Vickers Jockey
 Vickers Valentia
 Vickers Valetta
 Vickers Valiant
 Vickers Valparaiso
 Vickers Vampire
 Vickers Vanguard
 Vickers Vanox
 Vickers Varsity
 Vickers VC.1 Viking
 Vickers VC-10
 Vickers Vellore
 Vickers Vendace
 Vickers Venom
 Vickers Venture
 Vickers Vernon
 Vickers Vespa
 Vickers Viastra
 Vickers Victoria
 Vickers Viking
 Vickers Vildebeest
 Vickers Vimy
 Vickers Vincent
 Vickers Vireo
 Vickers Virginia
 Vickers Viscount
 Vickers Vixen
 Vickers Vulcan
 Vickers Warwick
 Vickers Wellesley
 Vickers Wellington
 Vickers Wellington Ic "Air Controlled Interception"
 Vickers Wellington DWI Mark II
 Vickers Wibault
 Vickers Windsor

Vickers
(Vickers Aircraft Company)
 Vickers Aircraft Wave

Vickers 
(Vickers plc)
 see: Vickers-Armstrongs

Victa 
(Victa Limited, Australia)
 Victa Aircruiser
 Victa Airtourer
 Victa Model 67
 Victa R-2

Victor 
(Victor Metal Aircraft Co, Camden, New Jersey, United States)
 Victor G-1 Sportster
 Victor-Knoll VK-1

Victory 
(Victory Aircraft Engr Co (pres: Forrest W Hicks), Victory Airport, North Hollywood, California)
 Victory SS-1

Vidal 
(Jerry Vidal)
 Vidal Plane-a-copter

Vidervol-Szaraz 
(James Vidervol & Arpad Szaraz, Cleveland, Ohio, United States)
 Vidervol-Szaraz VS-1

Vidor
(Giuseppe Vidor, Italy)
 Vidor Whiskey IV
 Vidor Champion V
 Vidor Junior VI
 Vidor Asso X Jewel

Viel
(Maurice Viel)
 Viel MV.1

Vieweg 
(Otto C Vieweg, Seattle, Washington, United States)
 Vieweg B-1-A

VIH
(Vliegtuig Industrie Holland, Netherlands)
 VIH Holland H.1
 VIH Holland H.2

Viking Aircraft Inc
(Panama City Beach, Florida, United States)
Viking Aircraft Viking II

Viking Aircraft LLC 
(Viking Aircraft LLC,  Elkhorn, Wisconsin)
 Viking SF-2A Cygnet
 Viking Dragonfly

Viking 
(Viking Flying Boat Co, 89 Shelton Ave, New Haven, Connecticut, United States)
 Viking B-8 Kittyhawk
 Viking OO
 Viking V-2

Villasana
(TNCA / Juan Guillermo Villasana)
 Villasana Series H (TNCA H)
 Villasana Latino America
 Villasana 1924 helicopter

Villamil
(Federico Cantero Villamil)
 Villamil Libélula Viblandi

Villars
(Maurice Villars)
 Villars MV.10

Villiers
(Ateliers d'Aviation François Villiers, Meudon)
Villiers II
Villiers IV
Villiers V
Villiers XI
Villiers VIII
Villiers XXIV
Villiers 26
Villiers 31

Villish
 Villish VM-5

Vincent 
(Guy O Vincent, Centerburg and Zanesville, Ohio, United States)
 Vincent Three seat Biplane
 Vincent Two seat Biplane

Vine
(S.W. Vine, Krugersdorp, Traansval)
 Vine 1930 glider
 Vine Altis (V1, V2 & V3)

Vintage Ultralight
(Vintage Ultralight and Lightplane Association, Marietta, Georgia, United States)
Chotia Gypsy
Chotia Woodhopper
Hovey Whing Ding
Mathews Mr Easy
Vintage Ultralight SR-1 Hornet

Vinters 
 see Vickers-Armstrongs

Vintras-Bouillier
(Jean Pierre Vintras et Lucien Bouillier)
 Vintras-Bouillier VB-20 Isard

Viper 
(Viper Aircraft Corporation, Pasco, Washington, United States)
 Viper Aircraft ViperJet
 Viper Aircraft ViperFan
 Viper Aircraft FanJet

Virmoux
(M Virmoux)
 Virmoux V.1
 Virmoux V.2

ViS 
(Vyacheslav i Svetlana Shkurenko)
 ViS Sprint
 ViS Sprint SKh
 KkAZ ViS-3
 KkAZ ViS-5
 KkAZ-30
 KkAZ ХАЗ-30

VisionAire Corp 
(VisionAire Corp, Chesterfield, Missouri, United States
 VisionAire Vantage

VL 
(Valtion Lentokonetehdas)
 VL D.27 Haukka I, II
 VL Humu
 VL Kotka I, II
 VL Myrsky
 VL Paarma
 VL Pyry
 VL Pyörremyrsky
 VL Sääski I, II, IIA
 VL Tuisku I, II
 VL Viima I, II

VL-DDR 
 VL-DDR 152

Vlaicu 1909-1914 
(Aurel Vlaicu)
 A Vlaicu I
 A Vlaicu II
 A Vlaicu III

Vogt
(Designer: Alfred Voght)
Vogt Lo-100
Vogt Lo-105 Zwergreiher
Vogt Lo-150
Vogt Lo-170

Vogt-Stockhausen
(Karl Vogt and Johann Stockhausen)
 Vogt-Stockhausen Adler

Voisin 
(Société Anonyme des Aéroplanes G. Voisin, France)
 Voisin 1907 biplane
 Voisin Type de Course
 Voisin 1909 Tractor Biplane Voisin tractor biplane
 Voisin 1910 Paris-Bordeaux racer
 Voisin 1910 de-Caters biplane
 Voisin 1911 military type
 Voisin 1911 Military Canard II Voisin Canard
 Voisin 1912 Icare Seaplane Voisin Icare Aero-Yacht
 Voisin 1913 (Voisin II / Type 2 / L)
 Voisin 1915 Triplane
 Voisin 1916 armoured reconnaissance aircraft
 Voisin E.28 (1916 triplane)
 Voisin E.50 (1917 triplane project)
 Voisin E.53 (1916 triplane with cannon for ground attack project)
 Voisin E.54
 Voisin E.59
 Voisin E.87 (Type XII)
 Voisin E.94 (Voisin 11 Bn.2)
 Voisin-Farman I
 Voisin I (Voisin Type I / Voisin L)
 Voisin II
 Voisin III (Voisin Type III / LA / LAS)
 Voisin IVCanon (Voisin Type 4 / LB / LBS)
 Voisin V (LAS)
 Voisin VI (LAS)
 Voisin VII (7 A.2 / LC)
 Voisin VIII (8 Bn.2 / LAP) (8 Ca.2 / LBP)
 Voisin IX (9 A.2 / LC)
 Voisin X (10 / LAR / LBR)
 Voisin XI (11 Bn.2 / E.94)
 Voisin XII (12 Bn.2)
 Voisin XIII
 Voisin L
 Voisin LA (III)
 Voisin LAR (X Bn.2)
 Voisin LAS designation used three times (III, V & VI)
 Voisin LAP (VIII Bn.2)
 Voisin LB (V)
 Voisin LBP (VIII Ca.2)
 Voisin LBR (X Ca.2)
 Voisin LBS (V Ca.2)
 Voisin LC designation used twice (VII A.2 and IX A.2)
 Voisin M
 Voisin O
 Voisin Creme de Menthe
 Voisin Wild Duck
 Voisin Canon 1913 (1913 - from L)

Vol Xerpa
(Barcelona, Spain)
Vol Xerpa ULM Pulsar

Volaire
(Volaircraft Inc (fdr: Jack Gilberti), Aliquippa, Pennsylvania, United States)
 Volaire 10
 Volaire 1035
 Volaire 1050

Volante
(Volante Aircraft Co (fdr: K P Rice), Santa Ana, California, United States)
 Volante Flying Car

Voliamo 
 Voliamo San Francesco

Volland
 Volland V-10

Volmer Jensen
(Volmer Jensen, Burbank, California, United States)
 Volmer Sport
 Volmer VJ-21 Jaybird
 Volmer VJ-22 Sportsman (a.k.a. Chubasco)
 Volmer VJ-23 Swingwing
 Volmer VJ-24W SunFun

Volocopter
 Volocopter 2X

Volpar
(Volpar Inc (Volitan & Paragon Corps), Van Nuys, California, United States)
 Volpar (Beechcraft) 18
 Volpar (Beechcraft) Super 18
 Volpar (Beechcraft) Turbo 18
 Volpar (Beechcraft) Super Turbo 18
 Volpar (Beechcraft) C-45G
 Volpar (Beechcraft) Turboliner
 Volpar (Beechcraft) Turboliner II
 Volpar (Beechcraft) Model 4000

Volta Volare
 Volta Volare GT4

VoltAero
 VoltAero Cassio

von Cosel 
(Carl T von Cosel, Key West, Florida, United States)
 von Cosel 1930 Monoplane

von Hagen 
(Alex von Hagen, Seattle, Washington, United States)
 von Hagen Flyer

Von Hoffman 
(Von Hoffman Aircraft Co, St Louis, Missouri, United States)
 Von Hoffman TP

Vortech 

 Vortech Skylark
 Vortech A/W 95
 Vortech Choppy
 Vortech Commuter
 Vortech G-1
 Vortech Hot Rod
 Vortech Kestrel Jet
 Vortech Meg-2XH Strap-On
 Vortech Scorpion
 Vortech Scorpion II
 Vortech Shadow
 Vortech Sparrow

Vortex 
(Vortex Aircraft Co, San Diego, California, United States)
 Vortex PhoenixJet

Vos
(Marquand Vos / Helicopter Manufacturing Company)
 Vos Springbok

Votaw 
(Vortex Aircraft Co, San Diego, California, United States)
 Votaw W-2V

Vought 
(De Witt C Vought )
 Vought 1911 aeroplane

Vought 
(Vought (Chance Vought),
Lewis & Vought, Vought-Sikorsky, Vought Corporation, United States)
 Vought A-7 Strikefighter
 Vought A-7 Corsair II
 Vought AU
 Vought-Hiller-Ryan C-142
 Vought F-8 Crusader
 Vought FU
 Vought F2U
 Vought F3U
 Vought F4U Corsair
 Vought XF5U Flying Pancake
 Vought F6U Pirate
 Vought F7U Cutlass
 Vought F8U Crusader
 Vought O-28
 Vought O2U
 Vought O3U
 Vought O4U
 Vought O5U
 Vought OS2U Kingfisher
 Vought OSU
 Vought S2U
 Vought SBU Corsair
 Vought SB2U Vindicator
 Vought SB3U
 Vought SO2U
 Vought SU
 Vought TBU Sea Wolf production as TBY from Consolidated Aircraft
 Vought UF
 Vought UO
 Vought WU
 Vought O24-2
 Vought V-50 Corsair
 Vought V-65 Corsair
 Vought V-66 Corsair
 Vought V-70 Corsair
 Vought V-80 Corsair
 Vought V-80P Corsair
 Vought V-85 Kurier
 Vought V-85G Kurier
 Vought V-90 Corsair
 Vought V-92 Corsair
 Vought V-93 Corsair
 Vought V-97 Corsair
 Vought V-99M Corsair
 Vought Corsair Junior
 Vought V-135
 Vought V-141
 Vought V-142
 Vought V-143
 Vought V-150
 Vought V-156 Vindicator
 Vought V-162
 Vought V-166
 Vought V-162
 Vought V-173
 Vought V-326
 Vought V-354
 Vought VE-7 Bluebird
 Vought VE-8
 Vought VE-9
 Vought VE-10 Bat Boat
 Vought VE-135
 Vought VS-315
 Vought-Cicero Umbrellaplane
 Vought Chesapeake
 Vought AXV V-143
 Vought Navy Experimental Type V Interceptor Fighter V-143
 Vought Model 1600
 Vought XF5U

VPM 
(VPM Snc - Vittorio Magni)
 VPM MT5
 VPM MT7

VSR
(VanMeter Smith Racing, Wichita, Kansas, United States)
VSR SR-1 Snoshoo

VTOL Aircraft 
 VTOL Aircraft Phillicopter

Vuia 
(Trajan Vuia)
 Vuia I
 Vuia II
 Vuia III
 Vuia No.1 helicopter 1908
 Vuia No.2 helicopter 1921

Vulcanair 
(Italy)
 Vulcanair Canguro
 Vulcanair Mission
 Vulcanair V1.0

Vultee 
((Gerard Freebairn) Vultee Aircraft Div, Aviation Mfg Corp-AVCO, Downey, California, United States)
 Vultee A-19
 Vultee A-31 Vengeance
 Vultee A-35 Vengeance
 Vultee A-41
 Vultee BC-3
 Vultee BT-13 Valiant
 Vultee BT-15
 Vultee BT-16
 Vultee P-54 Swoose Goose
 Vultee P-48
 Vultee P-66 Vanguard
 Vultee P-68 Tornado
 Vultee SNV
 Vultee TBV
 Vultee AB-2
 Vultee V-1
 Vultee V-11
 Vultee V-12
 Vultee 48
 Vultee 51
 Vultee 54
 Vultee 61
 Vultee V-72
 Vultee 74
 Vultee 75
 Vultee 76
 Vultee V-77
 Vultee 84

 Vultee 85
 Vultee 86
 Vultee 88
 Vultee 90
 Vultee YA-19

VUT 
 VUT 001 Marabu

VZLU
 VZLU HC-4
 VZLU TOM-8

References

Further reading

External links

 List of aircraft (V)